Manxman may refer to:

An inhabitant of the Isle of Man

Geography

Manxman's Lake, a sea loch of Scotland

Ships
HMS Manxman, ships of the Royal Navy
HMS Manxman (1903), formerly SS Manxman of the Midland Railway and later SS Manxman of the Isle of Man Steam Packet
, an Abdiel-class minelayer
TSS Manxman (1955), Isle of Man Steam Packet turbine steamer
Manxman class minelayer, an alternative name for Abdiel-class minelayer

The arts
The Manxman, a 1929 film directed by Alfred Hitchcock
The Manxman (1916 film), a 1916 British silent drama film
 The Manxman (novel), an 1894 book written by Hall Caine

Vehicles
Excelsior Manxman, a motorcycle designed and built by the Excelsior Motor Company
Manxman, a motorcycle manufactured by Norton Motorcycle Company
Peel Manxman, the earlier name of Peel Manxcar, a car made on the Isle of Man in 1955

See also
Manx (disambiguation), an adjective (and derived noun) describing things or people related to the Isle of Man